Zhou Xuezhong (born 16 January 1994) is a Chinese footballer currently playing as a forward for Jiangxi Beidamen.

Career statistics

Club
.

Notes

References

1994 births
Living people
Footballers from Henan
Chinese footballers
Association football forwards
China League Two players
China League One players
Henan Songshan Longmen F.C. players
Jiangxi Beidamen F.C. players